Maarten Van Lieshout (born 13 August 1985) is a Belgian former professional footballer who played as a defender.

Career
Born in Turnhout, Van Lieshout grew up in Ravels and began his career 1995 in the Netherlands with Willem II before joining Verbroedering Geel on 20 April 2007. The defender left this club in January 2009 to sign for KV Turnhout.

References

External links

1985 births
Living people
Belgian footballers
Sportspeople from Turnhout
Association football defenders
Willem II (football club) players
K.F.C. Verbroedering Geel players
KFC Turnhout players
K.F.C. Dessel Sport players
Belgian expatriate footballers
Expatriate footballers in the Netherlands
Belgian expatriate sportspeople in the Netherlands
Challenger Pro League players
Footballers from Antwerp Province